Operation Checkmate could refer to:

Operation Checkmate (commando raid) a Second World War British Commando raid
Operation Checkmate (Sri Lanka) a Sri Lankan anti-insurgency operation